Sergio Valdeolmillos Moreno (born April 4, 1967) is a Spanish basketball coach who is the current coach of Astros de Jalisco of the Mexican CIBACOPA. 

He coached the Mexico national team at the 2014 FIBA Basketball World Cup. Valdeolmillos also led Mexico to the 2013 FIBA Americas Championship and the 2014 Centrobasket Championship.

Valdeolmillos was named the LNBP Coach of the Year in 2022.

Trophies

Clubs
CB Ciudad de Huelva
LEB: (1) 1997
1996-97 LEB . C. B. Huelva. Champion. Promotion. 
1999-00 LEB . Club Ourense Baloncesto . Runner-up. Promotion. 
2003-04 LEB . CB Granada . Runner-up. Promotion. 
2005 Supercopa . CB Granada . Runner-up. 
Astros de Jalisco

 CIBACOPA champion: 2022

Mexico National Basketball Team
2011 Pan American Games  Mexico national basketball team . Silver medal. 
2013 COCABA Championship Mexico national basketball team . Gold medal. 
2013 FIBA Americas Championship Mexico national basketball team . Gold medal. 
2015 FIBA Americas Championship Mexico national basketball team . Fourth place.
2014 Centrobasket Mexico national basketball team . Gold medal. 
2016 Centrobasket Mexico national basketball team . Silver medal.
2016 FIBA World Olympic Qualifying Tournament  Mexico national basketball team .  Fourth place.

References

External links
Profile at ACB.com

1967 births
Living people
Liga ACB head coaches
Spanish basketball coaches
Spanish expatriate basketball people in Mexico
CB Estudiantes coaches